The OUTHouse was a New Zealand magazine-style talk show series that covered LGBT issues in New Zealand in a comedic manner, hosted by Greg Mayor, Amanda Betts and Andy Curtis.

See also
LGBT New Zealand

References

2000s New Zealand television series
LGBT culture in New Zealand
New Zealand LGBT-related television shows
New Zealand television talk shows
TVNZ original programming
Television shows funded by NZ on Air